Stéphane Billette (born April 21, 1971) is a Canadian politician in the province of Quebec, who was elected to represent the riding of Huntingdon in the National Assembly of Quebec in the 2008 provincial election. He is a member of the Quebec Liberal Party.

Born in Howick, Quebec, Billette obtained a bachelor's degree in business administration. He worked as a general manager at the local development centre (CLD) for the Haut-Saint-Laurent, commissioner for the Beauharnois-Salaberry CLD and an agent for the Beauharnois-Salaberry economic development society. Billette has been heavily informed in the economic development of the southern and western Montérégie region, being a member of other associations related to the economic development.  Billette is also running a company.

From April 2014 to October 2017 he served as the Chief Government Whip.

He served as Minister for Small and Medium Businesses.

References

External links
 
 Liberal Party biography 

Living people
Members of the Executive Council of Quebec
Quebec Liberal Party MNAs
People from Montérégie
1971 births
21st-century Canadian politicians